Metin Yüksel (July 17, 1958 – February 23, 1979), was a Muslim political and social activist from Turkey. One of the main leaders of Turkey's Islam movement during the 1970s, he also led the Akıncılar Organization, a political organization.

Early life
Yüksel was born on July 17, 1958 in the eastern Anatolian city of Bitlis. Little is known about his early life outside of his family's religious devotion, a characteristic that Yüksel would carry with him throughout his short life. His father, Sadreddin Yüksel, was a well-known religious scholar, famous amongst Turkey's religious. His brother, Edip Yüksel, is US based lawyer who has become known for converting to and advocating  Submitters religion (for which he was rejected by Metin and labeled an apostate by their father).

Activism
Growing up during the turbulent 1960s and 1970s, a period of near-anarchy and daily bloodshed amongst Turkey's political factions, Yüksel began his activism at an early age. Inspired by the ideas of his father and others, Yüksel quickly became active in the burgeoning Islamic movements that emerged in the early 1950s, following the onset of the multi-party period in 1945.

Asides from his political work, Yüksel also founded and led Akıncılar, a social welfare organization most prominent in the eastern Turkey, but existing throughout the country.

Assassination
Although Turkish Islamists of the day were careful to steer clear of the political violence between nationalist and Marxist factions in Turkey, many of them died nevertheless. 

On February 23, 1979, while leaving Friday prayers, Yüksel was shot dead outside Istanbul's Fatih Mosque by ultra-nationalist gunmen who were members of the Grey Wolves (Ülkücüler). He was 20 years old.

Legacy
Following his assassination, Yüksel became a martyr among Turkey's Muslim factions. His assassination led supporters to declare February as Şehit ("Martyr") month.

Every year on the anniversary of his death, supporters make pilgrimage to the spot where he was assassinated, in the yard of Fatih Mosque. It is common for them to hoist banners remembering him and paint red the spot where he fell.

References

See also
 List of assassinated people from Turkey

1958 births
1979 deaths
People from Bitlis
Deaths by firearm in Turkey
Turkish activists
Turkish Muslims
Kurdish Muslims
Assassinated Turkish people
People murdered in Turkey
Political violence in Turkey